Hancea is a genus of plants in the family Euphorbiaceae. Species include Hancea integrifolia.

See also
 Mallotus (plant)

Acalypheae
Euphorbiaceae genera